Howling Wilderness is a 1988 Post apocalyptic military tabletop role-playing game supplement for Twilight: 2000 published by Game Designers' Workshop.

Contents
Howling Wilderness is a supplement and campaign setting describing post-holocaust America, with rules for city creation including geomorphic city map pieces.

Publication history
Howling Wilderness was written by Loren Wiseman, with a cover by Steve Venters, and illustration by Timothy Bradstreet, and was published by Game Designers' Workshop in 1988 as a 48-page book.

Reception
In the December 1989 edition of Dragon (Issue 152), Jim Bambra called this supplement "fairly complete" and thought it "paints a grim picture for the years to come." Bambra concluded with a strong recommendation, saying, "This is an essential purchase for GMs basing their Campaigns in the States."

Reviews
White Wolf #13 (Dec., 1988)

References

Role-playing game supplements introduced in 1988
Science fiction role-playing game supplements
Twilight: 2000